American stand-up comedian Jeff Foxworthy has released eight albums. Foxworthy has also released several singles which have consisted of his comedy sketches set to music, often with a chorus sung by another country music act or studio musician. Most of these are from his 1996 compilation Crank It Up: The Music Album, although several of his comedy albums have included one musical track as well. Several of these songs have charted on the Billboard Hot Country Singles & Tracks (now Hot Country Songs) charts, the most successful being "Redneck 12 Days of Christmas" in 1996.

Studio albums

1990s

2000s & 2010s

Compilation albums

Box sets

Singles 

A"Party All Night" peaked at number 1 on Bubbling Under Hot 100 Singles.

Other singles

Christmas songs

Videography

Music videos

Notes

A^ Big Funny also peaked at number 30 on the Canadian RPM Country Albums chart.

References

Discographies of American artists
Comedian discographies
Country music discographies